is a temple of Koyasan Shingon Buddhism, located on , Wakayama prefecture, Japan. Its name means "Temple of limitless light" and is the Japanese transliteration of Amitābha.

The exact year is unknown.

References

External links 

 Muryōkōin official English site
 Muryōkōin official Japanese site
 Muryōkōin on Tripadvisor

Buddhist temples in Wakayama Prefecture